Reply All was an American podcast created and hosted by P. J. Vogt and Alex Goldman, produced by Gimlet Media. Reply All released its first episode on November 24, 2014. It peaked at #5 on the US iTunes charts on 3 December 2014. Emmanuel Dzotsi joined the show as a host in 2020. The show ended in 2022.

References

External links 
 Reply All episodes

Gimlet Media
Lists of podcast episodes